"Adios Amigo" is a song written by Ralph Freed and Jerry Livingston, performed by Jim Reeves, and released on the RCA label (catalog no. 45-RCA-1293). It debuted on the Billboard country and western charts in May 1962, spent nine weeks at the No. 2 spot, and remained on the charts for a total of 21 weeks. It was also ranked No. 5 on Billboards 1962 year-end country and western chart.

See also
 Billboard Top Country & Western Records of 1962

References

Jim Reeves songs
1962 songs
Songs written by Jerry Livingston